Aaron Burr Jr. (February 6, 1756 – September 14, 1836) was an American politician and lawyer who served as the third vice president of the United States from 1801 to 1805. Burr's legacy is defined by his famous personal conflict with Alexander Hamilton that culminated with Burr killing Hamilton in a duel in 1804, while Burr was vice president.

Burr was born to a prominent family in New Jersey. After studying theology at Princeton, he began his career as a lawyer before joining the Continental Army as an officer in the American Revolutionary War in 1775. After leaving military service in 1779, Burr practiced law in New York City, where he became a leading politician and helped form the new Jeffersonian Democratic-Republican Party. As a New York Assemblyman in 1785, Burr supported a bill to end slavery, despite having owned slaves himself.

At age 26, Burr married Theodosia Bartow Prevost, who died in 1794 after twelve years of marriage. They had one daughter, Theodosia.

In 1791, Burr was elected to the U.S. Senate, where he served until 1797. Burr would later run as the Democratic-Republican presidential candidate in the 1800 election. An electoral college tie between Burr and  Thomas Jefferson resulted in the House of Representatives voting in Jefferson's favor, with Burr becoming Jefferson's vice president due to receiving the second-highest share of the votes. Although Burr maintained that he supported Jefferson, the president was highly suspicious of Burr, who was relegated to the sidelines of the administration during his vice presidency and was not selected as Jefferson's running mate in 1804 after the ratification of the 12th Amendment to the U.S. Constitution.

During his last year as vice president, Burr engaged in the duel in which he fatally shot Hamilton, his political rival, near where Hamilton's son Philip Hamilton died three years prior. Although dueling was illegal, Burr was never tried, and all charges against him were eventually dropped. Nevertheless, Hamilton's death ended Burr's political career.

Burr traveled west to the American frontier, seeking new economic and political opportunities. His secretive activities led to his 1807 arrest in Alabama on charges of treason. He was brought to trial more than once for what became known as the Burr conspiracy, an alleged plot to create an independent country led by Burr, but was acquitted each time. With large debts and few influential friends, Burr left the United States to live as an expatriate in Europe. He returned in 1812 and resumed practicing law in New York City.  Burr's brief second marriage resulted in divorce and further scandal. Handicapped by a stroke and financially ruined, Burr died at a boarding house in 1836.

Early life

Aaron Burr Jr. was born in 1756 in Newark, New Jersey, as the second child of the Reverend Aaron Burr Sr., a Presbyterian minister and second president of the College of New Jersey, which became Princeton University. His mother Esther Edwards Burr was the daughter of noted theologian Jonathan Edwards and his wife Sarah. Burr had an older sister Sarah ("Sally"), who was named for her maternal grandmother. She married Tapping Reeve, founder of the Litchfield Law School in Litchfield, Connecticut.

Burr's father died in 1757 while serving as president of the college at Princeton. Burr's grandfather, Jonathan Edwards, succeeded Burr's father as president and came to live with Burr and his mother in December 1757. Edwards died in March 1758, and Burr's mother and grandmother died within the same year, leaving Burr and his sister orphaned when he was two years old. Young Aaron and Sally were then placed with the William Shippen family in Philadelphia. In 1759, the children's guardianship was assumed by their 21-year-old maternal uncle Timothy Edwards. The next year, Edwards married Rhoda Ogden and moved the family to Elizabeth, New Jersey where Burr attended the Elizabethtown Academy. Burr had a very strained relationship with his uncle, who was often physically abusive. As a child, he made several attempts to run away from home.

At age 13, Burr was admitted to Princeton as a sophomore, where he joined the American Whig Society and the Cliosophic Society, the college's literary and debating societies. In 1772, at age 16, he received his Bachelor of Arts degree, but continued studying theology at Princeton for an additional year. He then undertook rigorous theological training with Joseph Bellamy, a Presbyterian, but changed his career path after two years. At age 19, he moved to Connecticut to study law with his brother-in-law Tapping Reeve. In 1775, news reached Litchfield of the clashes with British troops at Lexington and Concord, and Burr put his studies on hold to enlist in the Continental Army.

Revolutionary War

During the American Revolutionary War, Burr took part in Colonel Benedict Arnold's expedition to Quebec, an arduous trek of more than  through the frontier of Maine. Arnold was impressed by Burr's "great spirit and resolution" during the long march. He sent him up the Saint Lawrence River to contact General Richard Montgomery, who had taken Montreal, and escort him to Quebec. Montgomery then promoted Burr to captain and made him an aide-de-camp. Burr distinguished himself during the Battle of Quebec on December 31, 1775, where he attempted to recover Montgomery's corpse after he had been killed.

In the spring of 1776, Burr's stepbrother Matthias Ogden helped him to secure a position with George Washington's staff in Manhattan, but he quit on June 26 to be on the battlefield. General Israel Putnam took Burr under his wing, and Burr saved an entire brigade from capture after the British landing in Manhattan by his vigilance in the retreat from lower Manhattan to Harlem. Washington failed to commend his actions in the next day's General Orders, which was the fastest way to obtain a promotion. Burr was already a nationally known hero, but he never received a commendation. According to Ogden, he was infuriated by the incident, which may have led to the eventual estrangement between him and Washington. Nevertheless, Burr defended Washington's decision to evacuate New York as "a necessary consequence". It was not until the 1790s that the two men found themselves on opposite sides in politics.

Burr was briefly posted in Kingsbridge during 1776, at which time he was charged with protecting 14-year-old Margaret Moncrieffe, the daughter of Staten Island-based British Major Thomas Moncrieffe. Miss Moncrieffe was in Manhattan "behind enemy lines," and Major Moncrieffe asked Washington to ensure her safe return there. Burr fell in love with Margaret, and Margaret's attempts to remain with Burr were unsuccessful.

In late 1776, Burr attempted to secure Washington's approval to retake fortifications held by the British on Staten Island, citing his deep familiarity with the area.  Washington deferred taking such actions until possibly later in the conflict (which ultimately were not attempted). The British learned of Burr's plans and afterwards took extra precautions.

Burr was promoted to lieutenant colonel in July 1777 and assumed virtual leadership of Malcolm's Additional Continental Regiment. There were approximately 300 men under Colonel William Malcolm's nominal command, but Malcolm was frequently called upon to perform other duties, leaving Burr in charge.  The regiment successfully fought off many nighttime raids into central New Jersey by Manhattan-based British troops who arrived by water. Later that year, Burr commanded a small contingent during the harsh winter encampment at Valley Forge, guarding "the Gulph," an isolated pass that controlled one approach to the camp. He imposed discipline and defeated an attempted mutiny by some of the troops.

Burr's regiment was devastated by British artillery on June 28, 1778, at the Battle of Monmouth in New Jersey, and Burr suffered heatstroke. This district was part of the more significant command of General Alexander McDougall, and there was much turbulence and plundering by lawless bands of civilians and by raiding parties of ill-disciplined soldiers from both armies.

In March 1779, due to continuing bad health, Burr resigned from the Continental Army. He renewed his study of law. Technically, he was no longer in the service, but he remained active in the war; he was assigned by General Washington to perform occasional intelligence missions for Continental generals, such as Arthur St. Clair. On July 5, 1779, he rallied a group of Yale students at New Haven, Connecticut, along with Captain James Hillhouse and the Second Connecticut Governor's Guards, in a skirmish with the British at the West River. The British advance was repulsed, forcing them to enter New Haven from Hamden, Connecticut.

Marriage to Theodosia Bartow Prevost

Burr met Theodosia Bartow Prevost in August 1778 while she was married to Jacques Marcus Prevost, a Swiss-born British officer in the Royal American Regiment. In Prevost's absence, Burr began regularly visiting Theodosia at The Hermitage, her home in New Jersey. Although she was ten years older than Burr, the constant visits provoked gossip, and by 1780 the two were openly lovers. In December 1781, he learned that Prevost had died in Jamaica of yellow fever.

Theodosia and Aaron Burr were married in 1782, and they moved to a house on Wall Street in Lower Manhattan. After several years of severe illness, Theodosia died in 1794 from stomach or uterine cancer. Their only child to survive to adulthood was Theodosia Burr Alston, born in 1783.

Law and politics
Despite his wartime activities, Burr finished his studies and was admitted to the bar at Albany, New York in 1782, the year of his marriage. He began practicing law in New York City the following year after the British evacuated the city.

Burr served in the New York State Assembly in 1784–85. In 1784, as an assemblyman, Burr unsuccessfully sought to abolish slavery immediately following the American Revolutionary War.
Also, he continued his military service as a lieutenant colonel and commander of a regiment in the militia brigade commanded by William Malcolm. He became seriously involved in politics in 1789, when George Clinton appointed him as New York State Attorney General. He was also Commissioner of Revolutionary War Claims in 1791. In 1791, he was elected by the legislature as a Senator from New York, defeating incumbent General Philip Schuyler. He served in the Senate until 1797.

Burr ran for president in the 1796 election and received 30 electoral votes, coming in fourth behind John Adams, Thomas Jefferson, and Thomas Pinckney. He was shocked by this defeat, but many Democratic-Republican electors voted for Jefferson and no one else, or for Jefferson and a candidate other than Burr. (Jefferson and Burr were again candidates for president and vice president during the election of 1800. Jefferson ran with Burr in exchange for Burr working to obtain New York's electoral votes for Jefferson.)

President John Adams appointed Washington as commanding general of U.S. forces in 1798, but he rejected Burr's application for a brigadier general's commission during the Quasi-War with France. Washington wrote, "By all that I have known and heard, Colonel Burr is a brave and able officer, but the question is whether he has not equal talents at intrigue." Burr was elected to the New York State Assembly in 1798 and served there through 1799. During this time, he cooperated with the Holland Land Company in gaining passage of a law to permit aliens to hold and convey lands. National parties became clearly defined during Adams' Presidency, and Burr loosely associated himself with the Democratic-Republicans. However, he had moderate Federalist allies such as Senator Jonathan Dayton of New Jersey.

New York City politics

Burr quickly became a key player in New York politics, largely due to the power of the Tammany Society (which became Tammany Hall). Burr converted it from a social club into a political machine to help Jefferson reach the presidency, particularly in crowded New York City.

In September 1799, Burr fought a duel with John Barker Church, whose wife Angelica was the sister of Alexander Hamilton's wife Elizabeth. Church had accused Burr of taking a bribe from the Holland Company in exchange for his political influence. Burr and Church fired at each other and missed, and afterward, Church acknowledged that he was wrong to have accused Burr without proof. Burr accepted this as an apology, and the two men shook hands and ended the dispute.

In 1799, Burr founded the Bank of the Manhattan Company, and the enmity between him and Hamilton may have arisen from how he did so. Before the establishment of Burr's bank, the Federalists held a monopoly on banking interests in New York via the federal government's Bank of the United States and Hamilton's Bank of New York. These banks financed operations of significant business interests owned by aristocratic members of the city. Hamilton had prevented the formation of rival banks in the city. Small businessmen relied on tontines to buy property and establish a voting voice (at this time, voting was based upon property rights). Burr solicited support from Hamilton and other Federalists under the guise that he was establishing a badly needed water company for Manhattan. He secretly changed the application for a state charter at the last minute to include the ability to invest surplus funds in any cause that did not violate state law, and dropped any pretense of founding a water company once he had gained approval (although he did dig a well and built a large working water storage tank on the site of his bank, which was still standing and apparently still working in 1898). Hamilton and other supporters believed that he had acted dishonorably in deceiving them. Meanwhile, construction was delayed on a safe water system for Manhattan, and writer Ron Chernow suggests that the delay may have contributed to deaths during a subsequent malaria epidemic.

Burr's Manhattan Company was more than a bank; it was a tool to promote Democratic-Republican power and influence, and its loans were directed to partisans. By extending credit to small businessmen, who then obtained enough property to gain the franchise, the bank was able to increase the party's electorate. Federalist bankers in New York responded by trying to organize a credit boycott of Democratic-Republican businessmen.

1800 presidential election

In the 1800 city elections, Burr combined the political influence of the Manhattan Company with party campaign innovations to deliver New York's support for Jefferson. In 1800, New York's state legislature was to choose the presidential electors, as they had in 1796 (for John Adams). Before the April 1800 legislative elections, the State Assembly was controlled by the Federalists. The City of New York elected assembly members on an at-large basis. Burr and Hamilton were the key campaigners for their respective parties. Burr's Democratic-Republican slate of assemblymen for New York City was elected, giving the party control of the legislature, which in turn gave New York's electoral votes to Jefferson and Burr. This drove another wedge between Hamilton and Burr.

Burr enlisted the help of Tammany Hall to win the voting for selection of Electoral College delegates. He gained a place on the Democratic-Republican presidential ticket in the 1800 election with Jefferson. Though Jefferson and Burr won New York, he and Burr tied for the presidency overall, with 73 electoral votes each. Members of the Democratic-Republican Party understood they intended that Jefferson should be president and Burr vice president, but the tied vote required that the final choice be made by the House of Representatives, with each of the 16 states having one vote, and nine votes needed for election.

Publicly, Burr remained quiet and refused to surrender the presidency to Jefferson, the great enemy of the Federalists. Rumors circulated that Burr and a faction of Federalists were encouraging Republican representatives to vote for him, blocking Jefferson's election in the House. However, solid evidence of such a conspiracy was lacking, and historians generally gave Burr the benefit of the doubt. In 2011, however, historian Thomas Baker discovered a previously unknown letter from William P. Van Ness to Edward Livingston, two leading Democratic-Republicans in New York. Van Ness was very close to Burr – serving as his second in the next duel with Hamilton. As a leading Democratic-Republican, Van Ness secretly supported the Federalist plan to elect Burr as president and tried to get Livingston to join. Livingston agreed at first, then reversed himself. Baker argues that Burr probably supported the Van Ness plan: "There is a compelling pattern of circumstantial evidence, much of it newly discovered, that strongly suggests Aaron Burr did exactly that as part of a stealth campaign to compass the presidency for himself." The attempt did not work, due partly to Livingston's reversal, but more to Hamilton's vigorous opposition to Burr.  Jefferson was ultimately elected president, and Burr vice president.

Vice presidency (1801–1805)

Jefferson never trusted Burr, so he was effectively shut out of party matters. As Vice President, Burr earned praise from some enemies for his even-handed fairness and his judicial manner as President of the Senate; he fostered some practices for that office that have become time-honored traditions. Burr's judicial manner in presiding over the impeachment trial of Justice Samuel Chase has been credited as helping to preserve the principle of judicial independence that was established by Marbury v. Madison in 1803. One newspaper wrote that Burr had conducted the proceedings with the "impartiality of an angel, but with the rigor of a devil".

Burr was not nominated to a second term as Jefferson's running mate in Jefferson's successful 1804 re-election campaign and New York governor George Clinton replaced Burr as Jefferson's vice president on March 4, 1805. Burr's farewell speech on March 2, 1805 moved some of his harshest critics in the Senate to tears. But the 20-minute speech was never recorded in full, and has been preserved only in short quotes and descriptions of the address, which defended the United States of America's system of government.

Duel with Hamilton

When it became clear that Jefferson would drop Burr from his ticket in the 1804 election, the Vice President ran for Governor of New York instead. Burr lost the election to little known Morgan Lewis, in what was the most significant margin of loss in New York's history up to that time. Burr blamed his loss on a personal smear campaign believed to have been orchestrated by his party rivals, including New York governor George Clinton. Alexander Hamilton also opposed Burr, due to his belief that Burr had entertained a Federalist secession movement in New York. In April, the Albany Register published a letter from Dr. Charles D. Cooper to Philip Schuyler, which relayed Hamilton's judgment that Burr was "a dangerous man and one who ought not to be trusted with the reins of government," and claiming to know of "a still more despicable opinion which General Hamilton has expressed of Mr. Burr". In June, Burr sent this letter to Hamilton, seeking an affirmation or disavowal of Cooper's characterization of Hamilton's remarks.

Hamilton replied that Burr should give specifics of Hamilton's remarks, not Cooper's. He said he could not answer regarding Cooper's interpretation. A few more letters followed, in which the exchange escalated to Burr's demanding that Hamilton recant or deny any statement disparaging Burr's honor over the past 15 years. Hamilton, having already been disgraced by the Maria Reynolds adultery scandal and mindful of his reputation and honor, did not. According to historian Thomas Fleming, Burr would have immediately published such an apology, and Hamilton's remaining power in the New York Federalist party would have been diminished. Burr responded by challenging Hamilton to a duel, personal combat under the formalized rules for dueling, the code duello.

Dueling had been outlawed in New York; the sentence for conviction of dueling was death. It was illegal in New Jersey as well, but the consequences were less severe. On July 11, 1804, the enemies met outside Weehawken, New Jersey, at the same spot where Hamilton's oldest son had died in a duel just three years prior. Both men fired, and Hamilton was mortally wounded by a shot just above the hip.

The observers disagreed on who fired first. They did agree that there was a three-to-four-second interval between the first and the second shot, raising difficult questions in evaluating the two camps' versions. Historian William Weir speculated that Hamilton might have been undone by his machinations: secretly setting his pistol's trigger to require only a half-pound of pressure as opposed to the usual 10 pounds. Weir contends, "There is no evidence that Burr even knew that his pistol had a set trigger." Louisiana State University history professors Nancy Isenberg and Andrew Burstein concur with this. They note that "Hamilton brought the pistols, which had a larger barrel than regular dueling pistols, and a secret hair-trigger, and were therefore much more deadly," and conclude that "Hamilton gave himself an unfair advantage in their duel, and got the worst of it anyway." However, other accounts state that Hamilton reportedly quietly responded "not this time" when his second, Nathaniel Pendleton, asked whether he would set the hair-trigger feature.

David O. Stewart, in his biography of Burr, American Emperor, notes that the reports of Hamilton's intentionally missing Burr with his shot began to be published in newspaper reports in papers friendly to Hamilton only in the days after his death. But Ron Chernow, in his biography, Alexander Hamilton, states Hamilton told numerous friends well before the duel of his intention to avoid firing at Burr. Additionally, Hamilton wrote several letters, including a Statement on Impending Duel With Aaron Burr and his last missives to his wife dated before the duel, which also attest to his intention. The second shot, witnesses reported, followed so soon after the first that witnesses could not agree on who fired first. Before the duel proper, Hamilton took a good deal of time getting used to the feel and weight of the pistol (which had been used in the duel at the same Weehawken site in which his 19-year-old son had been killed), as well as putting on his glasses to see his opponent more clearly. The seconds placed Hamilton so that Burr would have the rising sun behind him, and during the brief duel, one witness reported, Hamilton seemed to be hindered by this placement as the sun was in his eyes.

Each man took one shot. Burr's fatally injured Hamilton, while Hamilton's was purposely fired into the air. Burr's bullet entered Hamilton's abdomen above his right hip, piercing Hamilton's liver and spine. Hamilton was evacuated to the Manhattan home of a friend, William Bayard Jr., where he and his family received visitors including Episcopal bishop Benjamin Moore, who gave Hamilton the last rites. Burr was charged with multiple crimes, including murder, in New York and New Jersey, but was never tried in either jurisdiction.

He fled to South Carolina, where his daughter lived with her family, but soon returned to Philadelphia and then to Washington to complete his term as vice president. He avoided New York and New Jersey for a time, but all the charges against him were eventually dropped. In the case of New Jersey, the indictment was thrown out on the basis that, although Hamilton was shot in New Jersey, he died in New York.

Post-vice presidency (1805–1836)

Conspiracy and trial

After Burr left the vice presidency at the end of his term in 1805, he journeyed to the Western frontier, areas west of the Allegheny Mountains and down the Ohio River Valley eventually reaching the lands acquired in the Louisiana Purchase. Burr had leased 40,000 acres (16,000 ha) of land — known as the Bastrop Tract — along the Ouachita River, in present-day Louisiana, from the Spanish government. Starting in Pittsburgh and then proceeding to Beaver, Pennsylvania, and Wheeling, Virginia, and onward he drummed up support for his planned settlement, whose purpose and status was unclear.

His most important contact was General James Wilkinson, Commander-in-Chief of the U.S. Army at New Orleans, and Governor of the Louisiana Territory. Others included Harman Blennerhassett, who offered the use of his private island for training and outfitting Burr's expedition. Wilkinson would later prove to be a bad choice.

Burr saw war with Spain as a distinct possibility. In case of a war declaration, Andrew Jackson stood ready to help Burr, who would be in a position to join in immediately. Burr's expedition of about eighty men carried modest arms for hunting, and no war materiel was ever revealed, even when Blennerhassett Island was seized by Ohio militia. The aim of his "conspiracy," he always avowed, was that if he settled there with a large group of armed "farmers" and war broke out, he would have a force with which to fight and claim land for himself, thus recouping his fortunes.  However, the war did not come as Burr expected: the 1819 Adams–Onís Treaty secured Florida for the United States without a fight, and war in Texas did not occur until 1836, the year Burr died.

After a near-incident with Spanish forces at Natchitoches, Wilkinson decided he could best serve his conflicting interests by betraying Burr's plans to President Jefferson and his Spanish paymasters. Jefferson issued an order for Burr's arrest, declaring him a traitor before any indictment. Burr read this in a newspaper in the Territory of Orleans on January 10, 1807. Jefferson's warrant put Federal agents on his trail. Burr twice turned himself in to Federal authorities, and both times judges found his actions legal and released him.

Jefferson's warrant, however, followed Burr, who fled toward Spanish Florida. He was intercepted at Wakefield, in Mississippi Territory (now in the state of Alabama), on February 19, 1807. He was confined to Fort Stoddert after being arrested on charges of treason.

Burr's secret correspondence with Anthony Merry and the Marquis of Casa Yrujo, the British and Spanish ministers at Washington, was eventually revealed. He had tried to secure money and to conceal what may have been his true design, to help Mexico overthrow Spanish power in the Southwest. If Burr intended to found a dynasty in what would have become former Mexican territory this was a misdemeanor, based on the Neutrality Act of 1794, which Congress passed to block filibuster expeditions against U.S. neighbors, such as those of George Rogers Clark and William Blount. Jefferson, however, sought the highest charges against Burr.

In 1807, Burr was brought to trial on a charge of treason before the United States Circuit court at Richmond, Virginia. His defense lawyers included Edmund Randolph, John Wickham, Luther Martin, and Benjamin Gaines Botts. Burr had been arraigned four times for treason before a grand jury indicted him. The only physical evidence presented to the Grand Jury was Wilkinson's so-called letter from Burr, which proposed the idea of stealing land in the Louisiana Purchase. During the Jury's examination, the court discovered that the letter was written in Wilkinson's handwriting. He said he had made a copy because he had lost the original. The Grand Jury threw the letter out as evidence, and the news made a laughingstock of the General for the rest of the proceedings.

The trial, presided over by Chief Justice John Marshall, began on August 3. Article 3, Section 3 of the United States Constitution requires that treason either be admitted in open court, or proven by an overt act witnessed by two people. Since no two witnesses came forward, Burr was acquitted on September 1, despite the full force of the Jefferson administration's political influence thrown against him. Burr was immediately tried on a misdemeanor charge and was again acquitted.

Given that Jefferson was using his influence as president to obtain a conviction, the trial was a major test of the Constitution and the concept of separation of powers. Jefferson challenged the authority of the Supreme Court, specifically Chief Justice Marshall, an Adams appointee who clashed with Jefferson over John Adams' last-minute judicial appointments. Jefferson believed that Burr's treason was obvious. Burr sent a letter to Jefferson in which he stated that he could do Jefferson much harm. The case, as tried, was decided on whether Aaron Burr was present at certain events at certain times and in certain capacities. Thomas Jefferson used all of his influence to get Marshall to convict, but Marshall was not swayed.

Historians Nancy Isenberg and Andrew Burstein write that Burr:

David O. Stewart, on the other hand, insists that while Burr was not explicitly guilty of treason, according to Marshall's definition, evidence exists that links him to treasonous crimes. For example, Bollman admitted to Jefferson during an interrogation that Burr planned to raise an army and invade Mexico. He said that Burr believed that he should be Mexico's monarch, as a republican government was not right for the Mexican people. Many historians believe the extent of Burr's involvement may never be known.

Exile and return
By the conclusion of his trial for treason, despite an acquittal, all of Burr's hopes for a political comeback had been dashed, and he fled America and his creditors for Europe. Dr. David Hosack, Hamilton's physician and a friend to both Hamilton and Burr, lent Burr money for passage on a ship.

Burr lived in self-imposed exile from 1808 to 1812, passing most of this period in England, where he occupied a house on Craven Street in London. He became a good friend, even confidant, of the English Utilitarian philosopher Jeremy Bentham, and on occasion lived at Bentham's home. He also spent time in Scotland, Denmark, Sweden, Germany, and France. Ever hopeful, he solicited funding for renewing his plans for a conquest of Mexico but was rebuffed. He was ordered out of England and Emperor Napoleon of France refused to receive him. However, one of his ministers held an interview concerning Burr's goals for Spanish Florida or the British possessions in the Caribbean.

After returning from Europe, Burr used the surname "Edwards," his mother's maiden name, for a while to avoid creditors. With help from old friends Samuel Swartwout and Matthew L. Davis, Burr returned to New York and his law practice. Later he helped the heirs of the Eden family in a financial lawsuit. By the early 1820s, the remaining members of the Eden household, Eden's widow and two daughters, had become a surrogate family to Burr.

Later life and death

Despite financial setbacks, after returning, Burr lived out the remainder of his life in New York in relative peace until 1833.

On July 1, 1833, at age 77, Burr married Eliza Jumel, a wealthy widow who was 19 years younger. They lived together briefly at her residence which she had acquired with her first husband, the Morris-Jumel Mansion in the Washington Heights neighborhood in Manhattan. Listed on the National Register of Historic Places, it is now preserved and open to the public.

Soon after the marriage, Jumel realized her fortune was dwindling due to Burr's land speculation losses, so she separated from him after four months of marriage. She chose Alexander Hamilton Jr. as her divorce lawyer in 1834, the same year Burr suffered an immobilizing stroke. He died on Staten Island in the village of Port Richmond, in a boardinghouse that later became known as the St. James Hotel on September 14, 1836, the same day the divorce was officially completed. He was buried near his father in Princeton, New Jersey.

Personal life
In addition to his daughter Theodosia, Burr was the father of at least three other children and he adopted two sons. Burr also acted as a parent to his two stepsons by his wife's first marriage and he became a mentor or guardian to several protégés who lived in his home.

Burr's daughter Theodosia

Theodosia Burr was born in 1783 and was named after her mother. She was the only child of Burr's marriage to Theodosia Bartow Prevost who survived to adulthood. A second daughter, Sally, lived to the age of three.

Burr was a devoted and attentive father to Theodosia. Believing that a young woman should have an education equal to that of a young man, Burr prescribed a rigorous course of studies for her which included the classics, French, horsemanship and music. Their surviving correspondence indicates that he affectionately treated his daughter as a close friend and confidante as long as she lived.

Theodosia became widely known for her education and accomplishments. In 1801, she married Joseph Alston of South Carolina. They had a son together, Aaron Burr Alston, who died of fever at age ten. During the winter of 1812–1813, Theodosia was lost at sea with the schooner Patriot off the Carolinas, either murdered by pirates or shipwrecked in a storm.

Stepchildren and protégés

Upon Burr's marriage, he became stepfather to the two teenage sons of his wife's first marriage. Augustine James Frederick Prevost (called Frederick) and John Bartow Prevost had both joined their father in the Royal American Regiment in December 1780, at the ages of 16 and 14. When they returned in 1783 to become citizens of the United States, Burr acted as a father to them: he assumed responsibility for their education, gave both of them clerkships in his law office, and frequently was accompanied by one of them as an assistant when he traveled on business. John was later appointed by Thomas Jefferson to a post in the Territory of Orleans as the first judge of the Louisiana Supreme Court.

Burr served as a guardian to Nathalie de Lage de Volude (1782–1841) from 1794 to 1801, during Theodosia's childhood. The young daughter of a French marquis, Nathalie had been taken to New York for safety during the French Revolution by her governess Caroline de Senat. Burr opened his home to them, allowing Madame Senat to tutor private students there along with his daughter, and Nathalie became a companion and close friend to Theodosia. While traveling to France for an extended visit in 1801, Nathalie met Thomas Sumter Jr., a diplomat and the son of General Thomas Sumter. They married in Paris in March 1802, before returning to his home in South Carolina.  From 1810 to 1821, they lived in Rio de Janeiro, where Sumter served as the American ambassador to Portugal during the transfer of the Portuguese Court to Brazil. One of their children, Thomas De Lage Sumter, was a Congressman from South Carolina.

In the 1790s, Burr also took the painter John Vanderlyn into his home as a protégé, and provided him with financial support and patronage for 20 years. He arranged Vanderlyn's training by Gilbert Stuart in Philadelphia and sent him in 1796 to the École des Beaux-Arts in Paris where he remained for six years.

Adopted and acknowledged children
Burr adopted two sons, Aaron Columbus Burr and Charles Burdett, during the 1810s and 1820s after the death of his daughter Theodosia. Aaron (born Aaron Burr Columbe) was born in Paris in 1808 and arrived in America around 1815, and Charles was born in 1814.

Both of the boys were reputed to be Burr's biological sons. A Burr biographer described Aaron Columbus Burr as "the product of a Paris adventure," conceived presumably during Burr's exile from the United States between 1808 and 1814.

In 1835, the year before his death, Burr acknowledged two young daughters whom he had fathered late in his life, by different mothers. Burr made specific provisions for his surviving daughters in a will dated January 11, 1835, in which he left "all the rest and residue" of his estate, after other specific bequests, to six-year-old Frances Ann (born ), and two-year-old Elizabeth (born ).

Unacknowledged children

In 1787 or earlier, Burr began a relationship with Mary Emmons, also known as Eugenie, who may have been East Indian. She worked as a servant in his household during his first marriage. Emmons may have come from Calcutta to Haiti or Saint-Domingue before coming to America. Burr fathered two children with Emmons, both of whom married into Philadelphia's "Free Negro" community in which their families became prominent:
 Louisa Burr (Webb) (Darius) (-1878) worked most of her life as a valued servant in the home of Elizabeth Powel Francis Fisher, a prominent Philadelphia society matron, and later in the home of her son Joshua Francis Fisher. She was married to Francis Webb (1788–1829), a founding member of the Pennsylvania Augustine Education Society, secretary of the Haytien Emigration Society formed in 1824, and distributor of Freedom's Journal from 1827 to 1829. After his death, Louisa remarried and became Louisa Darius. Her youngest son Frank J. Webb wrote the 1857 novel The Garies and Their Friends.
 John Pierre Burr (–1864) became a member of Philadelphia's Underground Railroad and served as an agent for the abolitionist newspaper The Liberator. He worked in the National Black Convention movement and served as chairman of the American Moral Reform Society.

One contemporary of John Pierre Burr identified him as a natural son of Burr in a published account, but Burr never acknowledged his relationship or children with Emmons during his life, in contrast to his adoption or acknowledgment of other children born later in his life.

In 2018, Louisa and John were acknowledged by the Aaron Burr Association as the children of Burr after Sherri Burr, a descendant of John Pierre, provided both documentary evidence and results of a DNA test to confirm a familial link between descendants of Burr and descendants of John Pierre. The Association installed a headstone at John Pierre's grave to mark his ancestry. Stuart Fisk Johnson, the president of the association, commented, "A few people didn't want to go into it because Aaron's first wife, Theodosia, was still alive, and dying of cancer [when Aaron fathered John Pierre] ... But the embarrassment is not as important as it is to acknowledge and embrace actual living, robust, accomplished children."

Character
Aaron Burr was a man of complex character who made many friends, but also many powerful enemies. He was indicted for murder after the death of Hamilton, but never prosecuted; he was reported by acquaintances to be curiously unmoved by Hamilton's death, expressing no regret for his role in the result. He was arrested and prosecuted for treason by President Jefferson, but acquitted. Contemporaries often remained suspicious of Burr's motives to the end of his life, continuing to view him as untrustworthy at least since his role in the founding of the Bank of Manhattan.

In his later years in New York, Burr provided money and education for several children, some of whom were reputed to be his natural children. To his friends and family, and often to strangers, he could be kind and generous. The wife of the struggling poet Sumner Lincoln Fairfield recorded in her autobiography that in the late 1820s, their friend Burr pawned his watch to provide for the care of the Fairfields' two children. Jane Fairfield wrote that, while traveling, she and her husband had left the children in New York with their grandmother, who proved unable to provide adequate food or heat for them. The grandmother took the children to Burr's home and asked his help: "[Burr] wept, and replied, 'Though I am poor and have not a dollar, the children of such a mother shall not suffer while I have a watch.' He hastened on this godlike errand, and quickly returned, having pawned the article for twenty dollars, which he gave to make comfortable my precious babes."

By Fairfield's account, Burr had lost his religious faith before that time; upon seeing a painting of Christ's suffering, Burr candidly told her, "It is a fable, my child; there never was such a being."

Burr believed women to be intellectually equal to men and hung a portrait of Mary Wollstonecraft over his mantel. The Burrs' daughter, Theodosia, was taught dance, music, several languages, and learned to shoot from horseback. Until her death at sea in 1813, she remained devoted to her father. Not only did Burr advocate education for women, upon his election to the New York State Legislature, he submitted a bill, which failed to pass, that would have allowed women to vote. Hamilton attacked Burr for supporting the idea women were the intellectual equals of men.

Conversely, Burr was considered a notorious womanizer. In addition to cultivating relationships with women in his social circles, Burr's journals indicate that he was a frequent patron of prostitutes during his travels in Europe; he recorded brief notes of dozens of such encounters, and the amounts he paid. He described "sexual release as the only remedy for his restlessness and irritability".

Burr also fought against anti-immigrant sentiment, led by Hamilton's Federalist party, which suggested that anyone without English heritage was a second-class citizen, and even challenged the rights of non-Anglos to hold office. In response, Burr insisted that anyone who contributed to society deserved all the rights of any other citizen, no matter their background.

John Quincy Adams wrote in his diary when Burr died: "Burr's life, take it all together, was such as in any country of sound morals his friends would be desirous of burying in quiet oblivion." Adams' father, President John Adams, had frequently defended Burr during his life. At an earlier time, he wrote, Burr "had served in the army, and came out of it with the character of a knight without fear and an able officer".

Gordon S. Wood, a leading scholar of the revolutionary period, holds that it was Burr's character that put him at odds with the rest of the "founding fathers," especially Madison, Jefferson, and Hamilton. He believed that this led to his personal and political defeats and, ultimately, to his place outside the golden circle of revered revolutionary figures. Because of Burr's habit of placing self-interest above the good of the whole, those men thought that Burr represented a serious threat to the ideals for which they had fought the revolution. Their ideal, as particularly embodied in Washington and Jefferson, was that of "disinterested politics," a government led by educated gentlemen. They would fulfill their duties in a spirit of public virtue and without regard to personal interests or pursuits. This was the core of an Enlightenment gentleman, and Burr's political enemies thought that he lacked that essential core. Hamilton thought that Burr's self-serving nature made him unfit to hold office, especially the presidency.

Although Hamilton considered Jefferson a political enemy, he also believed him a man of public virtue. Hamilton conducted an unrelenting campaign in the House of Representatives to prevent Burr's election to the presidency and gain election of his erstwhile enemy, Jefferson. Hamilton characterized Burr as exceedingly immoral, an "unprincipled ... voluptuary" and deemed his political quest as one for "permanent power." He contended that Burr cared little about the Constitution and predicted that if he gained any more power, his leadership would continue to be for personal gain, while Jefferson was a true patriot and public servant, committed to preserving the Constitution.

Legacy
Although Burr is often remembered primarily for his duel with Hamilton, his establishment of guides and rules for the first impeachment trial set a high bar for behavior and procedures in the Senate chamber, many of which are followed today.

Historian Nancy Isenberg, explaining why Burr has been demonized in modern times, writes that Burr's villainy is actually the result of a smear campaign invented by his political enemies centuries ago, and then disseminated in newspapers, pamphlets and personal letters during and after his lifetime. According to her, pop-cultural portraits of Burr have blindly repeated these distortions, transforming Burr into the quintessential bad guy of early American history. Stuart Fisk Johnson describes Burr as progressive thinker and doer, a brave military patriot and brilliant lawyer who helped establish some of the physical infrastructure and guiding legal principles which helped in the founding of America.

A lasting consequence of Burr's role in the election of 1800 was the Twelfth Amendment to the United States Constitution, which changed how vice presidents were chosen. As was evident from the 1800 election, the situation could quickly arise where the vice president, as the defeated presidential candidate, could not work well with the president. The Twelfth Amendment required that electoral votes be cast separately for president and vice president.

Burr is also sometimes seen as one of the Founding Fathers of the United States, although this characterization is unusual.

Representation in literature and popular culture

 Burr appears as a character of worldly sophistication in Harriet Beecher Stowe's 1859 historical romance The Minister's Wooing.
 Edward Everett Hale's 1863 story "The Man Without a Country" is about a fictional co-conspirator of Burr's in the Southwest and Mexico, who is exiled for his crimes.
 My Theodosia (1945) by Anya Seton is a fictional interpretation of the life of Burr's daughter Theodosia.
 In The Jack Benny Program episode "The Alexander Hamilton Show", Jack Benny dreams that he is Alexander Hamilton; Dennis Day plays Burr.
 Gore Vidal's Burr: A Novel (1973) is part of his Narratives of Empire series.
 A 1993 "Got Milk?" commercial directed by Michael Bay features a historian obsessed with the study of Aaron Burr—he owns the guns and the bullet from the duel (see Aaron Burr (advertisement)).
 PBS's American Experience episode "The Duel" (2000) chronicled the events that led to the Burr–Hamilton duel.
 Burr is a principal character in the 2015 Broadway musical Hamilton, written by Lin-Manuel Miranda and inspired by historian Ron Chernow's 2004 biography of Hamilton. Leslie Odom Jr. won the 2016 Tony Award for Best Actor in a Musical for his portrayal of Aaron Burr.
 Mike Resnick's Alternate Presidents (1992) the short story "The War of '07" by Jayge Carr Burr is elected President in 1800 against Thomas Jefferson, establishes an alliance with Napoleon Bonaparte, and creates a family dictatorship.

References

Citations

 References in popular culture

Works cited

 
 
 
 
 
 
 
 
 
 
 
 
 
 
 
 
 
 
 
 
 
 
 
 
 
 
 
 
 
 
 
 
 
 
 
 
 
 
 
 
 
 
 
 
 
 
 
 
 
 
 
 
 
 
 
 
 
 
 
 
 
 
 
 
 
 
 
 Wood, Gordon S. "The Real Treason of Aaron Burr." Proceedings of the American Philosophical Society 143.2 (1999): 280-295. online

Further reading

Biographical
 Alexander, Holmes Moss. Aaron Burr: The Proud Pretender. 1937; Reprinted by Greenwood-Heinemann Publishing, 1973.
 Brands, H. W.  The Heartbreak of Aaron Burr (American Portraits Series) (2012).
 Cohalan, John P., The Saga of Aaron Burr. (1986)
 Künstler, Laurence S. The Unpredictable Mr. Aaron Burr (1974).
 Todd, Charles Burr. The True Aaron Burr: A Biographical Sketch (1902). New York, A.S. Barnes & Company. Available from Internet Archive.
 Vail, Philip. The Great American Rascal: The Turbulent Life of Aaron Burr (1973).

Scholarly topical studies
 Abernethy, Thomas Perkins. "Aaron Burr in Mississippi." Journal of Southern History 1949 15 (1): 9–21. 
 Adams, Henry, History of the United States, vol. iii. New York, 1890. (For the traditional view of Burr's conspiracy.)
 
 Faulkner, Robert K. "John Marshall and the Burr Trial". Journal of American History 1966 53(2): 247–258. 
 Freeman, Joanne B. "Dueling as Politics: Reinterpreting the Burr-Hamilton Duel." William and Mary Quarterly 53(2) (1996): 289–318. 
 Harrison, Lowell. 1978. "The Aaron Burr Conspiracy." American History I Illustrated 13:25.
 
 Larson, Edward J. A Magnificent Catastrophe: The Tumultuous Election of 1800, America's First Presidential Campaign. New York: Free Press, 2007.
 Melton, Buckner F. Jr. Aaron Burr: Conspiracy to Treason. New York: John Wiley, 2002. online edition
 Rogow, Arnold A. A Fatal Friendship: Alexander Hamilton and Aaron Burr (1998).
 Rorabaugh, William J. "The Political Duel in the Early Republic: Burr v. Hamilton". Journal of the Early Republic 1995 15(1): 1–23. 
 Wells, Colin. "Aristocracy, Aaron Burr, and the Poetry of Conspiracy". Early American Literature (2004).
 Wheelan, Joseph. Jefferson's Vendetta: The Pursuit of Aaron Burr and the Judiciary. New York: Carroll & Graff, 2005.

Primary sources
 Burr, Aaron. Political Correspondence and Public Papers of Aaron Burr. Mary-Jo Kline and Joanne W. Ryan, eds. 2 vol. Princeton University Press, 1983. 1311 pp.
 
 Ford, Worthington Chauncey. "Some Papers of Aaron Burr" Proceedings of the American Antiquarian Society 29#1: 43–128. 1919
 Robertson, David. Reports of the Trials of Colonel Aaron Burr (Late Vice President of the United States) for Treason and for Misdemeanor ... Two Volumes (1808) online
 Van Ness, William Peter. An Examination of the Various Charges Exhibited Against Aaron Burr, vice-president of the United States: and a Development of the Characters and Views of His Political Opponents. (1803) Available through Haithi Trust

External links

 
 
 Works at Open Library
 Did Aaron Burr Really Try to Take Over Half of America?
 The Aaron Burr Association
 Letters of Aaron Burr

 
1756 births
1836 deaths
Politicians from Newark, New Jersey
People of colonial New Jersey
Aaron
American people of English descent
Presbyterians from New Jersey
Vice presidents of the United States
Democratic-Republican Party vice presidents of the United States
Anti-Administration Party United States senators from New York (state)
Democratic-Republican Party United States senators from New York (state)
Candidates in the 1792 United States presidential election
Candidates in the 1796 United States presidential election
Candidates in the 1800 United States presidential election
1800 United States vice-presidential candidates
New York State Attorneys General
Members of the New York State Assembly
Leaders of Tammany Hall
New York (state) lawyers
American slave owners
American campaign managers
American company founders
Members of the New York Manumission Society
Left-wing populism in the United States
19th-century vice presidents of the United States
Princeton University alumni
Litchfield Law School alumni
American revolutionaries
Continental Army officers from New Jersey
American duellists
American expatriates in England
People acquitted of treason
Burials at Princeton Cemetery
United States senators who owned slaves